Camphor is a waxy, colorless solid with a strong aroma. It is classified as a terpenoid and a cyclic ketone.  It is found in the wood of the camphor laurel (Cinnamomum camphora), a large evergreen tree found in East Asia; and in the kapur tree (Dryobalanops sp.), a tall timber tree from South East Asia. It also occurs in some other related trees in the laurel family, notably Ocotea usambarensis. Rosemary leaves (Rosmarinus officinalis) contain 0.05 to 0.5% camphor, while camphorweed (Heterotheca) contains some 5%. A major source of camphor in Asia is camphor basil (the parent of African blue basil). Camphor can also be synthetically produced from oil of turpentine.

The compound is chiral, existing in two possible enantiomers as shown in the structural diagrams. The structure on the left is the naturally occurring (+)-camphor ((1R,4R)-bornan-2-one), while its mirror image shown on the right is the (−)-camphor ((1S,4S)-bornan-2-one). Camphor has few uses but is of historic significance as a compound that is readily purified from natural sources.

Etymology

In Old Malay, camphor was called , meaning "the chalk of Barus", referring to Barus, an ancient port near modern Sibolga on the western coast of Sumatra. This port traded in camphor extracted from the Borneo camphor trees (Dryobalanops aromatica) that were abundant in the region.

Production

Natural camphor
Camphor has been produced as a forest product for centuries, condensed from the vapor given off by the roasting of wood chips cut from the relevant trees, and later by passing steam through the pulverized wood and condensing the vapors. By the early 19th century most camphor tree reserves had been depleted with the remaining large stands in Japan and Taiwan, with Taiwanese production greatly exceeding Japanese. Camphor was one of the primary resources extracted by Taiwan's colonial powers as well as one of the most lucrative. First the Chinese and then the Japanese established monopolies on Taiwanese camphor. In 1868, a British naval force sailed into Anping harbor and the local British representative demanded the end of the Chinese camphor monopoly. After the local imperial representative refused, the British bombarded the town and took the harbor. The "camphor regulations" negotiated between the two sides subsequently saw a brief end to the camphor monopoly.

Synthetic camphor
Camphor is produced from alpha-pinene, which is abundant in the oils of coniferous trees and can be distilled from turpentine produced as a side product of chemical pulping. With acetic acid as the solvent and with catalysis by a strong acid, alpha-pinene into isobornyl acetate. Hydrolysis of this ester gives isoborneol which can be oxidized to gives racemic camphor. By contrast, camphor occurs naturally as D-camphor, the (R)-enantiomer.

Reactions
The reactions of camphor have been extensively examined.  Some representative transformations include
sulfonation:

oxidation with selenium dioxide to camphorquinone .  

Camphor can also be reduced to isoborneol using sodium borohydride.

Biochemistry

Biosynthesis
In biosynthesis, camphor is produced from geranyl pyrophosphate, via cyclisation of linaloyl pyrophosphate to bornyl pyrophosphate, followed by hydrolysis to borneol and oxidation to camphor.

Uses
The first significant manmade plastics were low-nitrogen (or "soluble") nitrocellulose (pyroxylin) plastics. In the early decades of the plastics industry, camphor was used in immense quantities as the plasticizer that creates celluloid from nitrocellulose, in nitrocellulose lacquers and other plastics and lacquers.

Alternative medicine and scent
Camphor has been used for its scent, as an embalming fluid, as topical medication, as a manufacturing chemical, and in religious ceremonies
Camphor has been used as a folk medicine over centuries, probably most commonly as a decongestant. Camphor was used in ancient Sumatra to treat sprains, swellings, and inflammation. Camphor also was used for centuries in traditional Chinese medicine for various purposes. In Europe, camphor was used after the Black Death era. 

In the 20th century, camphor was used as an analeptic by injection, and to induce seizures in schizophrenic people in an attempt to treat psychosis.

Camphor has limited use in veterinary medicine by intramuscular injection to treat breathing difficulties in horses.

Topical medication
Camphor is commonly applied as a topical medication as a skin cream or ointment to relieve itching from insect bites, minor skin irritation, or joint pain. It is absorbed in the skin epidermis, where it stimulates nerve endings sensitive to heat and cold, producing a warm sensation when vigorously applied, or a cool sensation when applied gently, indicating its properties as a counterirritant. The action on nerve endings also induces a slight local analgesia.

Respiratory aerosol
Camphor is also used via an aerosol, typically by steam inhalation, sometimes in the form of branded nasal inhaler sticks, to inhibit coughing and relieve upper airway congestion due to the common cold. However, the clinical efficiency of these remedies is challenged.

Other niche uses
Camphor is used by marksmen to blacken the front and rear sights of rifles to prevent the sights from reflecting.

Pest deterrent and preservative
Camphor is believed to be toxic to insects and is thus sometimes used as a repellent. Camphor is used as an alternative to mothballs. Camphor crystals are sometimes used to prevent damage to insect collections by other small insects. It is kept in clothes used on special occasions and festivals, and also in cupboard corners as a cockroach repellent. The smoke of camphor crystal or camphor incense sticks can be used as an environmentally-friendly mosquito repellent.

Recent studies have indicated that camphor essential oil can be used as an effective fumigant against red fire ants, as it affects the attacking, climbing, and feeding behavior of major and minor workers.

Camphor is also used as an antimicrobial substance. In embalming, camphor oil was one of the ingredients used by ancient Egyptians for mummification.

Solid camphor releases fumes that form a rust-preventative coating and is therefore stored in tool chests to protect tools against rust.

Perfume
In the ancient Arab world, camphor was a common perfume ingredient. The Chinese referred to the best camphor as "dragon's brain perfume", due to its "pungent and portentous aroma" and "centuries of uncertainty over its provenance and mode of origin".

Culinary uses
One of the earliest known recipes for ice cream dating to the Tang dynasty includes camphor as an ingredient. It was used to flavor leavened bread in ancient Egypt. In ancient and medieval Europe, camphor was used as an ingredient in sweets. It was used in a wide variety of both savory and sweet dishes in medieval Arabic language cookbooks, such as al-Kitab al-Ṭabikh compiled by ibn Sayyār al-Warrāq in the 10th century. It also was used in sweet and savory dishes in the Ni'matnama, according to a book written in the late 15th century for the sultans of Mandu. It is a main constituent of a spice known as "edible camphor" (or kapur), which may be used in traditional South Indian desserts like Payasam and Chakkarai Pongal.

Religious rites

Camphor is widely used in Hindu religious ceremonies. Aarti is performed after placing it on a stand and setting fire to it usually as the last step of puja. Camphor is mentioned in the Quran as being the fragrance of wine given to believers in heaven. Camphor is also mentioned in Jewish sources, regarding if you need to fast during a pandemic.

Toxicity
Applied on skin, camphor may cause allergic reactions in some people; when ingested by mouth, camphor cream or ointment is poisonous. In high ingested doses, camphor produces symptoms of irritability, disorientation, lethargy, muscle spasms, vomiting, abdominal cramps, convulsions, and seizures. Lethal doses by ingestion in adults are in the range 50–500 mg/kg (orally). Generally, ingestion of two grams causes serious toxicity and four grams is potentially lethal.

Airborne camphor may be toxic if respired by humans. Permissible camphor limit (PEL) in the ambient air is 2 mg/m3 at exposure time (TWA) not more than 8 hours. 200 mg/m3 is considered a very dangerous concentration (IDLH).

History of synthetic camphor
When its use in the nascent chemical industries (discussed below) greatly increased the volume of demand in the late 19th century, potential for changes in supply and in price followed. In 1911 Robert Kennedy Duncan, an industrial chemist and educator, related that the Imperial Japanese government had recently (1907–1908) tried to monopolize the production of natural camphor as a forest product in Asia but that the monopoly was prevented by the development of the total synthesis alternatives, which began in "purely academic and wholly uncommercial" form with Gustav Komppa's first report:

This ongoing check on price growth was confirmed in 1942 in a monograph on DuPont's history, where William S. Dutton said, "Indispensable in the manufacture of pyroxylin plastics, natural camphor imported from Formosa and selling normally for about 50 cents a pound, reached the high price of $3.75 in 1918 [amid the global trade disruption and high explosives demand that World War I created]. The organic chemists at DuPont replied by synthesizing camphor from the turpentine of southern US pine stumps, with the result that the price of industrial camphor sold in carload lots in 1939 was between 32 cents and 35 cents a pound."

 The background of Gustaf Komppa's synthesis was as follows. In the 19th century, it was known that nitric acid oxidizes camphor into camphoric acid. Haller and Blanc published a semisynthesis of camphor from camphoric acid. Although they demonstrated its structure, they were unable to prove it. The first complete total synthesis of camphoric acid was published by Komppa in 1903. Its inputs were diethyl oxalate and 3,3-dimethylpentanoic acid, which reacted by Claisen condensation to yield diketocamphoric acid. Methylation with methyl iodide and a complicated reduction procedure produced camphoric acid. William Perkin published another synthesis a short time later. Previously, some organic compounds (such as urea) had been synthesized in the laboratory as a proof of concept, but camphor was a scarce natural product with a worldwide demand. Komppa realized this, and began industrial production of camphor in Tainionkoski, Finland, in 1907 (with plenty of competition, as Kennedy Duncan reported).

See also
 1,4-Dichlorobenzene
 Citral
 Eucalyptol
 Lavender
 Vaporizer

References

External links

INCHEM at IPCS (International Programme on Chemical Safety)
NIOSH Pocket Guide to Chemical Hazards – Camphor at Centers for Disease Control and Prevention

Pyrotechnic chemicals
Cooling flavors
Perfume ingredients
Ketones
Monoterpenes
Ayurvedic medicaments
Spices
Non-timber forest products
Cyclopentanes